Judith Ralston (née Tonner) is a Scottish weather presenter, and former singer.

Early life and music career
Ralston trained as a musician and studied singing at the Royal Scottish Academy of Music and Drama in Glasgow and then the Royal Northern College of Music in Manchester. Her operatic singing career ended at 28 after a vocal injury.

Broadcasting career
In 1999 Ralston returned to Scotland as a traffic reporter at BBC Scotland, then moved into news and weather presenting. She was listed as the third most popular weather presenter in a UK-wide vote in a 2017 Radio Times poll.

Personal life
She lives in Glasgow and is married to Fraser Ralston, a meteorologist. They have 3 children together.

References

Living people
Alumni of the Royal Conservatoire of Scotland
Alumni of the Royal Northern College of Music
BBC weather forecasters
Television personalities from Edinburgh
Year of birth missing (living people)